Cecil Correa was a U.S. soccer defender who earned one cap with the U.S. national team in a 4-0 loss to Poland on August 10, 1973.   Correa, and most of his team mates, were from the second division American Soccer League after the first division North American Soccer League refused to release players for the game.

References

American soccer players
United States men's international soccer players
American Soccer League (1933–1983) players
Living people
Association football defenders
Year of birth missing (living people)